The spread eagle is one of the moves in the field in the sport of figure skating, in which a skater glides on both feet, the toes turned out to the sides, heels facing each other. It can be performed on either the inside or outside edges. It is commonly used as an entrance to jumps, adding to the difficulty level of that jump under the Code of Points. It is most commonly used an entrance to an Axel jump.

Gallery

Single

Pairs

Ice dancing

Synchronized skating

External links

Read more about Spread eagles

Spread eagle